Murdrum was the crime of murdering someone in a secret manner. It was introduced into English law by the Danes. It is distinguished from simple homicide. In the Laws of Canute an unknown man who was killed was presumed to be a Dane, and the vill/tithing was compelled to pay 40 marks for his death. After the Norman conquest the law was revived in respect of the Norman aristocracy. It was abolished in the reign of Edward III.  Richard I of England exempted the Knights Templar from being charged with murdrum and  Latrocinium amongst other privileges.

When King Henry I granted tax liberties to London in 1133, he exempted the city from taxes such as scot, danegeld, and murdrum.

References

Further reading

Murder